Joseph Gleydson Vacher (16 November 1869 – 31 December 1898) was a French serial killer and necrophile, sometimes known as "The French Ripper" or "L'éventreur du Sud-Est" ("The South-East Ripper") owing to comparisons to the more famous Jack the Ripper murderer of London, England, in 1888. His scarred face and plain, white, handmade rabbit-fur hat composed his trademark appearance. He killed 11 to 27 people, many of whom were adolescent farm workers, between 1894 and 1897.

Life
The son of an illiterate farmer, young Joseph Gleydson Vacher was sent to a very strict Catholic school where he was taught to obey and to fear God. Seeking escape from the intense poverty of his childhood as the 15th child of a peasant family, he joined the army in 1892. Frustrated by slow promotion and no recognition, and infused with the grandiose belief that he was not receiving the attention he deserved, Vacher attempted to kill himself by slicing his throat. This was the first of two suicide attempts.

While Vacher had been in the army, he fell in love with a young maidservant, Louise, who was not attracted to him and spurned his advances. After his attempted suicide led to his dismissal from the military, he again tried to court her, even going so far as to propose marriage. Bored by him and uninterested in his offer, she mocked him and his proposal. This second slight also motivated violence: in a rage, Vacher shot Louise four times and then tried to commit suicide. Both attempts were unsuccessful—Louise was badly injured but survived the shooting, and Vacher severely maimed himself. Shooting himself twice in the head, Vacher succeeded in paralyzing one side of his face, deforming him severely. One of the bullets remained lodged in his ear for the remainder of his life, and the damage to his brain likely exacerbated his existing mental illness. He felt that the shooting damaged him more than physically: he later claimed, after his arrest, that the reactions of strangers to this self-inflicted deformity drove him to hatred of society at large. This second suicide attempt put him in a mental institution in Dole, Jura. Despite a one-year stay and a pronouncement from his doctors that he was "completely cured," Vacher began murdering his victims shortly after his release at the age of 25.

During a three-year period beginning in 1894, Vacher murdered and mutilated at least 11 people (one woman, five teenage girls, and five teenage boys). Many of them were shepherds watching their flocks in isolated fields. The victims were stabbed repeatedly, often disemboweled, raped, and sodomized. Vacher became a drifter, travelling from town to town, from Normandy to Provence, staying mainly in the southeast of France and surviving by begging or working on farms as a day laborer. By most accounts, he was unkempt and frightening, wandering from town to town as a vagrant in filthy clothes, begging in the streets and surviving on the scraps he received from anyone who spared him a kindness. 

In 1897 Vacher tried to assault a woman gathering wood in a field in Ardèche. She fought back and her screams soon alerted her husband and son, both of whom came rushing to her aid. The men overpowered Vacher and took him to the police. Despite their belief that they had apprehended the man responsible, the authorities had little evidence that Vacher was responsible for the series of murders. However, and with little apparent prompting, Vacher confessed to committing all eleven murders, saying, "I committed them all in moments of frenzy."

Insanity plea
After his arrest, Vacher claimed he was insane and attempted to prove it in a variety of ways. He claimed that a rabid dog's bite had poisoned his blood, causing madness, but later blamed the quack cure he received for the bite. He also claimed he was sent by God, comparing himself to Joan of Arc. Despite his protestations, he was pronounced sane after lengthy investigations by a team of doctors that included the eminent professor Alexandre Lacassagne. He was tried and convicted by the Cour d'Assises of Ain, the county where he had murdered two of his victims, and was sentenced to death on 28 October 1898. Vacher was executed by guillotine at dawn two months later, on 31 December 1898. He refused to walk to the scaffold under his own power and was dragged to the guillotine by the executioners.

Legacy
Vacher's place in French social history is similar to Jack the Ripper's place in British social history.

In popular culture
 In 1976 French filmmaker Bertrand Tavernier made a film called Le juge et l'assassin (The Judge and the Murderer) that was inspired by Vacher's story. The name of the murderer, played by Michel Galabru, is slightly changed into "Joseph Bouvier" (in French, the words bouvier and vacher describe the same profession, herdsman).
 In the 1949 novel The Sheltering Sky by Paul Bowles, in private dialogue with her husband Port, the character Kit Morseby says of the Eric Lyle character: "He looks like a young Vacher".
 In the episode "Probable Cause" of the TV series Castle, serial killer 3XK uses Vacher's name as an alias.
 In the film Psychopathia Sexualis Vacher is the first case study of a sexual mental illness presented.

See also
 List of French serial killers

Citations

General bibliography 
 Lacassagne, Alexandre, Vacher l'éventreur et les crimes sadiques, 1899 On-line (French)
 Bouchardon, Pierre, Vacher l'éventreur, Albin Michel, 1939, 252 p.
 Deloux, Jean-Pierre, Vacher l'éventreur, E/dite Histoire, 2000 (1995), 191 p. (Main source used to improve this article)
 Garet, Henri and Tavernier, René, Le juge et l'assassin, Presses de la cité, 1976, 315 p.
 Hülsmanns, Dieter. Vakher, Joseph Melzer Verlag, Darmstadt, 1966, 97 p.
 Kershaw, Alister. Murder in France, Constable, London, 1955, 188 p.
 Lane, Brian. "Encyclopedia of Serial Killers", Diamond Books, 1994.
 Koq. La peau de Vacher, Edilivre, 2013, 404p.
 Starr, Douglas: The Killer of Little Shepherds: A True Crime Story and the Birth of Forensic Science. Alfred A. Knopf, New York 2010.  [hard cover, 300 p],  [eBook]

External link
 

1869 births
1898 deaths
19th-century executions by France
Executed French people
Executed French serial killers
Executed people from Rhône-Alpes
French murderers of children
French people convicted of murder
French rapists
Male serial killers
Necrophiles
People convicted of murder by France
People executed by France by guillotine
People executed by the French Third Republic
People from Grenoble